Lepidochrysops vera, the Vera's giant Cupid, is a butterfly in the family Lycaenidae. It is found in Nigeria.

Adults have been recorded on wing in May and June.

References

Butterflies described in 1961
Lepidochrysops
Endemic fauna of Nigeria
Butterflies of Africa